2nd Lancers or 2nd Lancers Regiment may refer to the following military units:
2nd Lancers (Gardner's Horse), Bengal Army, British Indian Army, and Indian Army unit
2nd Lancers Regiment of the Belgian Army, later amalgamated into the 2nd/4th Lancers Regiment
2nd Lancers Regiment (Portugal)
2nd Württemberg Uhlans, later the 20th (2nd Württemberg) Uhlans "King William I"